Dame Ann Marian Ebsworth, DBE (19 May 1937 – 4 April 2002) was an English barrister and judge. In 1992, she became the sixth female High Court judge, and the first to be assigned to the Queen's Bench Division.

Ebsworth's father, Arthur Ebsworth, was an officer in the Royal Marines and her early life was spent in various barracks. She was educated at Notre Dame Convent, Worth, West Sussex, and at Portsmouth High School. She read history at Royal Holloway College, University of London, where she was a formidable debater, captaining teams in intercollegiate contests.

She was called to the Bar at Gray's Inn in 1962, where she was later a bencher. She practised mainly in Liverpool, concentrating on criminal work. She became head of her chambers, but did not become a QC. She became a Recorder in the Crown Court in 1978, and a circuit judge in 1983. She served on the Mental Health Review Tribunal from 1975 to 1983, and on the Parole Board from 1989 to 1992.

She was appointed a High Court judge in 1992, becoming the sixth female High Court judge after Elizabeth Lane, Rose Heilbron, Margaret Booth, Elizabeth Butler-Sloss and Joyanne Bracewell. All previous female High Court judges were appointed to the Family Division.

Ebsworth was the first to be assigned to the Queen's Bench Division.  On 20 May 1992, the day after her 55th birthday, Ebsworth was appointed a Dame Commander of the Order of the British Empire (DBE).

In later life, she was involved in teaching advocacy at Gray's Inn, and for the South Eastern Circuit, particularly at an annual course at Keble College, Oxford.

Religion
One source: indicate that Ebsworth was a Roman Catholic, but other sources and obituaries make no mention of this. Her funeral service was held at Gray's Inn on 10 April 2002.

Death
She retired in 2001 due to Peritoneal Mesothelioma, a rare form of cancer, of which she died on 4 April 2002, aged 64. She never married.

Legacy
 She left £1 million to the Institute of Child Health to fund research under the auspices of the Ann Ebsworth Centre for Childhood Epilepsy, at Great Ormond Street Hospital.
 The Dame Ann Ebsworth Memorial Lectures are held annually at the Inner Temple in her memory. The first was given in 2006 by the Hon. Michael Kirby (Justice of the High Court of Australia). Subsequently, the lecture has been given by: the Hon. Mr Justice Louis Harms (former Deputy President of the South African Supreme Court); the Hon. Antonin Scalia (Associate Justice of the US Supreme Court); the Rt. Hon. Lord Bingham of Cornhill (former Master of the Rolls, Lord Chief Justice and Senior Law Lord); the Rt. Hon. Lord Hoffman (former Law Lord); the Hon. Mr Justice Hardiman (Justice of the Supreme Court of Ireland); the Rt. Hon. Lord Justice Moses (Court of Appeal of England & Wales); the Rt. Hon. Lord Hughes (Justice of the Supreme Court of the United Kingdom). The ninth annual lecture will be delivered by the Hon. Stephen Breyer (Associate Justice of the US Supreme Court).

References

External links
 Obituary The Guardian, 12 April 2002
 Obituary, The Daily Telegraph, 9 April 2002
 Dame Ann Ebsworth Second Memorial Lecture
 London Gazette notice of damehood, 20 May 1992

1937 births
2002 deaths
Alumni of the University of London
English barristers
English philanthropists
English women judges
English women lawyers
Deaths from cancer in England
Dames Commander of the Order of the British Empire
Deaths from mesothelioma
Members of Gray's Inn
Lawyers from Portsmouth
Place of birth missing
Place of death missing
Queen's Bench Division judges
Lawyers from Liverpool
People educated at Portsmouth High School (Southsea)
20th-century British philanthropists
20th-century women lawyers
20th-century English lawyers
20th-century English women